Klimzowiec (German: Klimsawiese) is a historical district of Chorzów, nowadays part of the city's Centre district.

The settlement was established in the 19th century (in the years 1850–1866) near the mill belonging the miller Klimzy. 

In 1868 Klimsawiese became a part of Königshütte (now known as Chorzów).

In 1922 following the Upper Silesian Plebiscite and the Silesian uprisings, Klimsawiese along with the rest of Königshütte (Polish: Królewska Huta, from 1934 Chorzów) became a part of Poland.

References

Sources
"KLIMZOWIEC". mojchorzow.p. Retrieved 27 October 2020.
"Chorzów – Klimzowiec". dziennikzachodni.pl. Retrieved 27 October 2020.

Chorzów
Neighbourhoods in Silesian Voivodeship